Lyndsey Olson is an American attorney and serving as the city attorney for Saint Paul, Minnesotal.

Early life and education
She received a Bachelor of Arts degree from Stephens College in 1998 and a Juris Doctor from the Hamline University School of Law in 2003. She entered the United States Army Judge Advocate General's Corps and attended The Judge Advocate General's Legal Center and School at the University of Virginia.

Career
Olson served in Operation Iraqi Freedom. While in Iraq, she received a Bronze Star for her service as international law and military justice attorney. From 2013 to 2018, Olson served as the general counsel of the Minnesota Department of Military Affairs and Minnesota National Guard from 2013 to 2018. In 2013, Minnesota Business Journal named her in their Top 40 Under 40 list, as well as their list of top in-house counsel and Minnesota Lawyer’s Attorneys of the Year. Olson sits on the board of directors for Central Minnesota Legal Services. In 2013, became a part-time adjunct law professor at the University of Minnesota Law School.

Olson currently serves as a Colonel in the United States Army Judge Advocate General's Corps. In 2018, Olson was appointed as the cityaAttorney of St. Paul by Mayor Melvin Carter in 2018. During the George Floyd protests in Minneapolis–Saint Paul, Olson said that cases would be dismissed for people engaging in peaceful protests that did not involve acts of violence.

References

External links
 St. Paul City Attorney's Office

Living people
Stephens College alumni
21st-century American politicians
21st-century American women politicians
21st-century American lawyers
21st-century American women lawyers
Year of birth missing (living people)